Bhubaneswar has roads in grid form in the central city. Baramunda Inter State Bus Terminus (ISBT) is the major bus terminus in the city from where buses ply to all the districts in Odisha as well as to neighbouring state's cities like Hyderabad, Kolkata, Visakhapatnam, Raipur and Ranchi. City bus service runs in public-private partnership between Bhubaneswar-Puri Transport Service Limited (BPTSL) and Dream Team Sahara (DTS) under JNNURM scheme. A fleet of 185 buses cover all major destinations including Cuttack, Puri and Khordha. Auto rickshaws are available for hire and on a share basis throughout the city. In parts of the city, cycle rickshaws offer short trips. To ease traffic jams, over-bridges at major road junctions and expansion of roads are under construction. In a study of six cities in India, Bhubaneswar was ranked third concerning pedestrian infrastructure. The city scored 50 points out of maximum 100. The government of Odisha introduced the much-awaited Bhubaneswar BRTS (bus rapid transit) in Bhubaneswar.

Rajpath
Rajpath is a major east-west thoroughfare in Bhubaneswar, Odisha, India. Rajpath starts from Kalpana Square crossing with NH 203 and ends at Raj Bhawan Chak, crossing with Bidyut Marg and Gopabandu-Governor House Road. It has important crossing with Janpath and Sachivalaya Marg. A flyover over Rajmahal crossing was opened in 2012 to reduce traffic congestion. The stretch from Rajmahal to Kalpana Square has numerous budget Hotels to suit different tourists and travelers.

Landmarks

 Kalpana Talkies
 Hotel Pushpak
 Hotel Sishmo
 Rajmahal Flyover
 State Bank of India
 Capital Police Station
 Market Building
 AG Square
 Bhubaneswar Club
 Raj Bhavan

Sachivalaya Marg
Sachivalaya Marg is a major North-South thoroughfare in Bhubaneswar, Odisha. Sachivalaya Marg starts from AG Square, crossing with Rajpath, Bhubaneswar and ends at Kalinga Hospital Square, in Chandrasekharpur. It has important crossing with NH 5. The road has many important offices and educational institutions. The southern part of the road continues as Hospital Road, extending into the New Terminal of Bhubaneswar Airport. In 2012-2013, the stretch from Sainik School to Acharya Vihar Square was beautified with sculptures and plantations.

Landmarks
 Paribahana Bhavan
 Indira Gandhi Park
 Odisha State Secretariat
 Odisha Legislative Assembly
 Head Post Office
 Rabindra Mandap
 Keshari Talkies
 SBI Head Office
 RBI Regional Office
 National Informatics Center
 Jama Masjid
 State Library
 State Archives
 Regional Institute of Education
 Demonstration Multipurpose School
 Science Park
 Pathani Samanta Planetarium 
 Regional Museum of Natural History, Bhubaneswar
 Utkal University
 Institute of Physics, Bhubaneswar
 Institute of Mineral Sciences
 Apollo Hospital
 Sainik School

Bus-routes on the road are 225 KIIT University Campus- Kalpana, 306 KIIT University Campus - Balakati Bazaar, 324 Bidanasi Village - Master Canteen

Janpath
Janpath is a major north-south thoroughfare in Bhubaneswar, Odisha. Janpath starts from Vani Vihar crossing with NH5 and ends at Sishu Vihar Square. It passes through localities like Saheed Nagar, Satya Nagar, Kharvel Nagar, Ashok Nagar, Bapuji Nagar. The road was widened to 8 lanes, with led-street lighting in 2012.  The road is a hub for retailers and hotels. There is plan to construct foot over bridges over Janpath near RD College and Master Canteen square for road safety of pedestrians.

Landmarks
 Raj Mahal Flyover
 IIPM
 Forum Mart
 Pantaloons
 Wills Lifestyle
 Rama Devi Women's University
 IPCOL - IDCO Tower Building
 Reliance Trends
 Kendriya Vidyalaya
 Fashion Planet
 Ram Mandir, Bhubaneswar
 Hotel Arya Palace
 Hotel Marrion
 Hotel The Royale Midtown
 Lalchand Jewellers
 Bhubaneswar railway station
 Master Canteen Square
 INOX Bhubaneswar, Forum Mall, S-Complex, Market Building Area off Janpath

Bidyut Marg
Bidyut Marg is a major north-south thoroughfare in Bhubaneswar, Odisha. Bidyut Marg starts from  Raj Bhawan Chak, crossing with Rajpath and Gopabandu-Governor House Road and ends at Jayadev Vihar crossing with NH 5. The northern part of the road continues as Nandan Kanan Road beyond Jayadev Vihar. It has important crossing with Gopabandhu Marg, Patel Marg and Sachivalaya Marg and Baya Baba Matha Road. The road was widened to four lanes with median and street beautification in 2007-2008.

Landmarks
 Raj Bhavan (Odisha)
 Police Commissionerate Building
 120 Infantry Battalion
 The World Mall
 Kalinga Stadium

Ekamra Marg
Ekamra Marg is a major thoroughfare in Bhubaneswar, Odisha. Ekamra Marg stretches from OUAT, crossing with New Airport Road and Hospital Road, Bhubaneswar and ends at Pallaspalli, near the Old Town. The Biju Patnaik International Airport is the main landmark  as it is connected with the New Airport Road. It is one of the most beautiful roads of Bhubaneswar.

Landmarks
 Biju Patnaik International Airport
 Orissa University of Agriculture and Technology
 Maa Shakti Hospital
 Forest Park
 Apollo Pharmacy
 Odisha Modern Art Gallery
 Pallaspalli

Bus routes
 207/207A Biju Patnaik International Airport - Nandankanan Zoological Park

Nandan Kanan Road
Nandan Kanan Road is the long continued road of the Bidyut Marg, which is a major thoroughfare in Bhubaneswar, Odisha. It starts from the Jaydev Vihar Interchange and ends in Nandankanan Zoological Park and the road then continues on as Nandankanan — Chandaka Road.

Landmarks
 Aryapalli
 Bhubaneswar New Railway Station
 Cafe Coffee Day — Nandan Kanan Road
 Cafe Italiano
 CARE Hospital
 Chandrasekharpur
 Centre for Environment and Development
 The Mayfair Lagoon Hotel
 Trident Hotel
 Gandhi Park
 Hotel Ginger
 KIIT University
 The Fortune Towers
 Doordarshan Colony
 Pal Heights Hotel
 Raghunathpur
 Sandy's Tower Hotel
 Sishu Vihar
 Swosti Premium Hotel
 Sikharchandi Vihar
 East Coast Railways Headquarters
 Kalinga Institute of Medical Sciences
 Institute of Minerals and Materials Technology (IMMT)
 Xavier Institute of Management Technology (XIMB)

Bus routes
 207/207A Airport — Nandankanan
 225 KIIT University Campus — Kalpana
 306 KIIT University Campus — Balakati Bazaar
 315 Hi Tech Hospital Medical College & Hospital - Mayfair Hotel
 324 Bidanasi Village — Master Canteen

References

Streets in Bhubaneswar